KTRT (97.5 FM, "The Root") is a radio station licensed to Winthrop, Washington, United States.

References

External links
 

TRT
Okanogan County, Washington
Radio stations established in 2008
2008 establishments in Washington (state)